Oligodon fasciolatus, commonly known as the small-banded kukri snake or the fasciolated kukri snake, is a species of snake in the family Colubridae. The species is native to Southeast Asia.  This snake uniquely eviscerates live poisonous toads, Duttaphrynus melanostictus (Asian common toads), to avoid toxic white liquid the toad secretes.

Geographic range
O. fasciolatus is found in Cambodia, Laos, southeastern Myanmar, Thailand, and Vietnam.

Habitat
The preferred natural habitat of O. fasciolatus is forest.

Description

Reproduction
O. fasciolatus is oviparous.

References

Further reading
Günther ACLG (1864). The Reptiles of British India. London: The Ray Society. (Taylor and Francis, printers). xxvii + 452 pp. + Plates I-XXVI. (Simotes fasciolatus, new species, pp. 218–219 + Plate XX, figure B, two views of head).

External links
 See also Duttaphrynus melanostictus for:
Bringsøe H, Suthanthangjai M, Suthanthangjai W, Nimnuan K (2020). "Eviscerated alive: Novel and macabre feeding strategy in Oligodon fasciolatus (Günther, 1864) eating organs of Duttaphrynus melanostictus (Schneider, 1799) in Thailand". Herpetozoa 33: 157–163. Published online September 11, 2020. doi:10.3897/herpetozoa.33.e57096. 
Garcia de Jesus E (2020). "This snake rips a hole in living toads’ stomachs to feast on their organs". ScienceNews, October 2, 2020.

fasciolatus
Snakes of Southeast Asia
Reptiles of Cambodia
Reptiles of Laos
Reptiles of Myanmar
Reptiles of Thailand
Reptiles of Vietnam
Reptiles described in 1864
Taxa named by Albert Günther
Snakes of Vietnam
Snakes of Asia